Under the Whyte notation for the classification of steam locomotives, a 2-8-8-8-4 has two leading wheels, three sets of eight driving wheels, and four trailing wheels.

Other equivalent classifications are:
UIC classification: 1DDD2 (also known as German classification and Italian classification)
French classification: 140+040+042
Turkish classification: 45+44+46
Swiss classification: 4/5+4/4+4/6

The equivalent UIC classification is to be refined to (1'D)D(D2') for these engines.

Only one 2-8-8-8-4 was ever built, a Mallet-type for the Virginian Railway in 1916. Built by Baldwin Locomotive Works, it became the only example of their class XA, so named due to the experimental nature of the locomotive. Like the same railroad's large articulated electrics and the Erie Railroad 2-8-8-8-2s, it was nicknamed "Triplex".

An overview of Triplex engineering is given at Triplex (locomotive).

The XA was unable to sustain a speed greater than five miles an hour, since the six cylinders could easily consume more steam than the boiler could produce. When operating in compound the high pressure steam was divided between the cylinders of the center engine. The exhaust from one cylinder was piped to the front articulated engine. The exhaust from the other center engine cylinder was piped to the tender engine.

The exhaust from the front engine was piped to the exhaust nozzle inside the firebox to generate draft through the firebox, through the fire tubes and out the exhaust stack. The exhaust from the tender engine went out of a stack at the rear of the tender water tank. Unfortunately it did not contribute to draft, being wasted. The tender had a four-wheel truck at the rear to help guide the locomotive into curves when drifting back downhill after pushing a train over the hill.

The XA was sent back to Baldwin in 1920 and was rebuilt as two locomotives, a 2-8-8-0,and a 2-8-2. Unlike their predecessor which lasted only a few years in service, these two locomotives remained in service until 1953. However, neither of the two locomotives were preserved.

References

External links
Web Site of ToyTrains1 2-8-8-8-4 Triplex Steam Locomotives
Virginian Class XA

888,2-8-8-8-4
XA
Baldwin locomotives
Steam locomotives of the United States
Individual locomotives of the United States
Railway locomotives introduced in 1916